Preangeria is an extinct genus of gastropods belonging to the family Eosiphonidae.

The species of this genus are found in Malesia.

Species:

 † Preangeria angsanana 
 † Preangeria dentata 
 † Preangeria javana 
 † Preangeria praeundosa 
 † Preangeria sundaica 
 † Preangeria talahabensis

References

 Martin, K. (1921). Die Mollusken der Njalindungschichten. Sammlungen des Geologischen Reichs-Museums in Leiden. new ser., 1(2), Heft 3: 446-496.
 Shuto, T. 1969. Neogene gastropods from Panay Island, the Philippines. Contributions to the geology and paleontology of Southeast Asia, LXVII. Memoirs of the Faculty of Science, Kyushu University, series D, Geology 19(1):1-250, 43 figs., 24 pls.
 Raven, J.G.M. (H.). (2016). Notes on molluscs from NW Borneo. 3. A revision of Taurasia (Gastropoda, Muricidae) and Preangeria (Gastropoda, Buccinidae) with comments on Semiricinula from NW Borneo. Vita Malacologica. 15: 77-104

Eosiphonidae